Thomas Joseph Madden (July 31, 1883 – July 26, 1930) was a Major League Baseball outfielder. In five career games, he had four hits in 16 at-bats.

He was born in and died in Philadelphia

External links

1883 births
1930 deaths
Baseball players from Pennsylvania
Boston Beaneaters players
New York Highlanders players
Haverhill Hustlers players
Utica Pent-Ups players
Montreal Royals players
San Francisco Seals (baseball) players
Sacramento Sacts players